Judah ben Simon Sofer Frankfurt Ashkenazi (Tiktin) was a Polish commentator on the Shulchan Aruch. He officiated as "dayyan" (assistant rabbi) at Tikotzin, Poland, in the first half of the eighteenth century.

Main work

He wrote Ba'er Hetev (also spelled B’er Heteb) ("Explaining Well"), which comments briefly on the first three parts of the Shulchan Aruch ("Orach Chayim", "Yoreh De'ah", and "Even Ha'ezer"). A similar commentary on the fourth part of the Shulchan Aruch — that is, on the "Choshen Mishpat" — was written by Rabbi Moses Frankfurter, dayyan of Amsterdam. Ashkenazi's work was appended to the Shulchan Aruch in the editions of Amsterdam, 1753 and 1760, and went through many editions.

References

18th-century Polish rabbis
Authors of books on Jewish law
Place of birth unknown
Place of death missing
Year of birth unknown
Year of death missing